The Bell Telephone Building, located at 920 Olive Street in downtown St. Louis, Missouri, was built in 1889 for the purposes of housing the switchboard and local headquarters of the Bell Telephone Company.  The building served as the main telephone exchange for St. Louis from its construction until 1926, and it is the oldest extant telephone building in St. Louis (and possibly was the first building constructed for the telephone industry in St. Louis).

History and restoration
The earliest St. Louis telephone exchange was located in the National Bank Building at 417 Olive (since demolished) in 1878. By the late 1880s, space for a dedicated telephone exchange facility was needed. Groundbreaking occurred in 1889 after the acceptance of the Boston-based Shepley, Rutan and Coolidge design, and the final construction cost was $154,225. The main switchboard room was at the top of the building (then only six stories). Between 1890 and 1910 telephone use expanded dramatically, and the local St. Louis Bell Company merged with other Bell telephone companies to form Southwestern Bell by 1920. In 1923, Southwestern Bell absorbed the local St. Louis telephone competitor, Kinloch Telephone, adding to pressure on the capacity of the building. These pressures resulted in the construction of the nearby Southwestern Bell Building in St. Louis between 1923 and 1926.

After Southwestern Bell vacated the building, it became used as a retail and warehouse facility for the St. Louis print company S.G. Adams Stationery, which was purchased by Comfort Printing in 1959 (but continued operating under the original name). The building became the flagship store for S.G. Adams during the 1960s through the 1980s. However, S.G. Adams refocused its business model on commercial printing in the early 1990s, closing its retail locations. The Bell Telephone Building became the final retail store of S.G. Adams, and it was closed and vacated in 1994.

Between 1999 and 2004, restoration of the building created residential loft apartments in upper floors, with commercial retail at ground level. One of the early ground level tenants was City Grocers, a specialty market that also dealt in necessities for downtown condo and loft dwellers, which assumed the place of the only grocery store in downtown St. Louis from its opening in 2004 until the opening of a new format of Schnucks supermarket at Olive and 9th streets in 2009.

 Upper floors of the building continue to be used as residential apartments under the operation of St. Louis LoftWorks

Architecture

The building is a seven-story commercial building of brick and red sandstone, with three-story arcades rising from the ground-level storefronts.  The building originally was built with six stories, while a seventh was added in the same style as the lower levels in 1919 to meet rising demands for space. In 1940, a limestone sheath covered the original storefronts after the building was purchased by S.G. Adams.  The eastern wall of the building is blank brick and rises above a neighboring four-story building. The roof is flat, while a parapet wall surrounds the building on all sides.

Bell Telephone primarily is significant for its rarity in St. Louis architecture. Most downtown Romanesque Revival buildings were demolished during the 20th century, with some notable exceptions (such as the Cupples Station warehouse complex). It also is one of only a handful of buildings in St. Louis designed by either Henry Hobson Richardson or his successor firm Shepley, Rutan and Coolidge.

References

External links
 Bell Lofts, rental residences located in the Bell Telephone Building
 Information on the Bell Telephone Building at BuiltStLouis

Buildings and structures in St. Louis
Architecture of St. Louis
Landmarks of St. Louis
Bell System
Romanesque Revival architecture in Missouri
Telephone exchange buildings
Telecommunications buildings on the National Register of Historic Places
Commercial buildings in Missouri
Commercial buildings on the National Register of Historic Places in Missouri
National Register of Historic Places in St. Louis
Downtown St. Louis